Ivan Ivanov (born 4 June 1983) is a Bulgarian football player.

References

External links

Living people
1983 births
Bulgarian footballers
PFC Svetkavitsa players
First Professional Football League (Bulgaria) players

Association football defenders